Min and Bill is a 1930 American Pre-Code comedy-drama film, directed by George W. Hill and starring Marie Dressler and Wallace Beery. Adapted by Frances Marion and Marion Jackson from Lorna Moon's 1929 novel, Dark Star, the film tells the story of dockside innkeeper Min's tribulations as she tries to protect the innocence of her adopted daughter, Nancy, while loving and fighting with boozy fisherman Bill, who resides at the inn. The picture was a runaway hit. In 1931, the studio released a Spanish-language version of Min and Bill, La fruta amarga, directed by Arthur Gregor and starring Virginia Fábregas and Juan de Landa.

Min and Bill stars Dressler (Min), Beery (Bill), Dorothy Jordan (Nancy), and Marjorie Rambeau (Bella, Nancy's disreputable mother). Dressler won the Academy Award for Best Actress in 1931 for her performance in this film. Beery received the Academy Award for Best Actor in 1931 for playing the title role in The Champ, which “fully vaulted him from character player to genuine movie star.”

Beery became MGM's highest-paid actor in the early 1930s, before Clark Gable took over that crown; Beery had a clause in his 1932 contract that he be paid a dollar per year more than any other actor on the lot.

In 1933, the studio teamed Dressler and Beery as a married couple in Tugboat Annie, which was also a huge success. In 1933, Dressler topped Quigley Publications' annual Top Ten Money Making Stars Poll of movie exhibitors in 1931 and 1932.  She died of cancer in July 1934.

Plot
Min Divot (Marie Dressler) runs a dockside inn. She has been raising Nancy Smith (Dorothy Jordan) as her own since her prostitute mother, Bella (Marjorie Rambeau), left her at the inn as an infant. Min frequently argues with fisherman Bill (Wallace Beery). Despite Bill's near-constant drinking, Min and he care for each other. Bill and she are the only ones who know the identity of Nancy's real, still living, mother.

Min does her best to raise Nancy and keep her from learning about the real activities of the people who live and work on the docks. Despite not having much extra money or a home outside her inn, Min does her best to raise Nancy into a young lady. She does everything she can to make sure Nancy is never around when Bella arrives for a visit.

Nancy loves Min as her own mother and frequently skips school to be with her. After repeatedly dealing with the truant officer, Min uses the money she had hidden in her room to send Nancy to a fancy boarding school. She hopes the school will teach Nancy better manners than those she had been picking up from Bill and the others on the docks. The schooling works, and Nancy returns to Min with good manners, an education, and the news that she is now engaged to a very wealthy man named Dick Cameron. She wants Min to attend the wedding.

Min is thrilled, until she finds out that Bella has returned. Seeing how happy Nancy is to be getting married (and the wedding will be taking place in a few days), Min deliberately argues with Nancy and says terrible things she does not mean for Nancy to immediately leave. She is mad at herself for hurting Nancy, but is relieved that she is gone by the time Bella arrives. Min stalls Bella, hoping the wedding will take place and the couple can leave for their honeymoon before Bella can interfere.

Bella arrives as the ceremony takes place. She confronts Min in an upstairs room in her inn. She has discovered her daughter's identity, and that of her very wealthy new husband. She taunts Min with the information and pledges to torment Nancy and her new husband until they give her money and take her into their new home.

Min thinks about the wedding and Nancy's happiness, and tries to prevent Bella from leaving. When Bella attacks Min with a hot curling iron and attempts to leave, Min takes a hidden gun and shoots her dead. Min drops the gun and flees the room. Bill, knowing what was going on, tries to help Min by pleading with her to drive down to Mexico on his boat. Once Min and Bill leave the inn for the boat, an eavesdropping sailor enters Min's room and discovers Bella's corpse. Just as Min and Bill are about to board Bill's boat, however, Min sees Nancy and Dick Cameron about to board a boat to their honeymoon, and is drawn silently to the happy couple. She wants to see Nancy one last time.. Min watches, but decides not to let Nancy know she is there, and stays hidden in the crowd. Two police officers quietly confront Min about the shooting at the inn. Min does not say much. She takes one final look at a smiling Nancy as she leaves with her husband. Min turns back and smiles as she quietly walks away with the officers. She is sad that it may be the last time she ever sees Nancy, but at the same time, she is happy that Nancy managed to escape a dead-end life by the docks. Bill watches helplessly.

Cast

 Marie Dressler as Min Divot
 Wallace Beery as Bill
 Dorothy Jordan as Nancy Smith
 Marjorie Rambeau as Bella Pringle
 Donald Dillaway as Dick Cameron
 DeWitt Jennings as Groot
 Russell Hopton as Alec Johnson
 Frank McGlynn, Sr. as Mr. Southard (credited as Frank McGlynn)
 Gretta Gould as Mrs. Southard

In popular culture

Jack Kerouac, in On the Road, has his protagonist-narrator Sal Paradise compare Dean Moriarty and his second wife Camille to Min and Bill.

Reception
The film made a profit of $731,000.

References

External links

 
 Min and Bill, tcm.com; accessed July 28, 2015.
 
 

1930 films
1930 comedy-drama films
American comedy-drama films
American black-and-white films
Films based on British novels
Films directed by George Hill
Films featuring a Best Actress Academy Award-winning performance
Films produced by Harry Rapf
Metro-Goldwyn-Mayer films
Films with screenplays by Frances Marion
1930s English-language films
1930s American films

it:Castigo#Cinema